Lisryan is a village in County Longford, Ireland.

Transport
Lisryan is located on the Regional Road the R395 road. The nearest towns are Granard and Edgeworthstown. Granard is served by the Bus Éireann number 111 bus service. Twice on a Friday only, the bus route changes slightly and the bus drives through the village of Lisryan; and people can journey to Granard or Dublin. Edgeworthstown is served by the Iarnród Éireann Sligo to Dublin train service.

Activities
Lisryan is a rural village. There are many opportunities to walk and bicycle in the area. There is also a sports field located within the village which is used for association football and Gaelic games.

There is a bring bank for glass in Lisryan, one of 25 such banks in County Longford.

Coolamber Manor
Cloonshanagh or Coolamber Manor Demesne (in Irish: Cluain Seanach meaning "lawn or meadow of the foxes". Or Cul Amra meaning "hill-back of the trough") is a large country house on a site of approximately 150 acres. It is located just outside the village of Lisryan. It was a drug rehabilitation centre, however its doors are now closed.

See also
 List of towns and villages in Ireland

References

Towns and villages in County Longford